Rolands Bulders (born 12 March 1965 in Liepāja) is a retired Latvian international footballer. He obtained a total number of 33 caps for the Latvia national football team, scoring three goals. His last club was FK Ventspils.

References

1965 births
Living people
Latvian footballers
Latvia international footballers
Sportspeople from Liepāja
Latvian expatriate footballers
Association football forwards
FK Jelgava players
FK Liepājas Metalurgs players
IK Brage players
Stadler FC footballers
FK Ventspils players